The Cambridge station of Cambridge, Minnesota was built in 1899 and served the Great Northern Railway and successor Burlington Northern until 1971. Passenger service ceased upon the formation of Amtrak, but resumed between Minneapolis and Superior in 1975. Cambridge was served by the Arrowhead and later the North Star between Chicago and Duluth. Service ceased after April 7, 1985. The station building still exists, but has been relocated from the tracks.

References

External links
Cambridge, Minnesota – TrainWeb

Former Amtrak stations in Minnesota
Former Great Northern Railway (U.S.) stations
1899 establishments in Minnesota
Railway stations in the United States opened in 1899
Railway stations closed in 1971
Railway stations in the United States opened in 1975
Railway stations closed in 1985